Nicola Hughes may refer to:
Nicola Hughes (actress), English dancer, singer and actress
Nicola Hughes (policewoman), murdered British police constable